Sagenothrips is a genus of thrips in the family Phlaeothripidae.

Species
 Sagenothrips gracilicornis

References

Phlaeothripidae
Thrips
Thrips genera